Príslop is a village and municipality in Snina District in the Prešov Region of north-eastern Slovakia.

History
In historical records the village was first mentioned in 1568.

Geography
The municipality lies at an altitude of 425 metres and covers an area of 6.183 km². According to the 2013 census it had a population of 59 inhabitants.

References

External links
 
 
http://www.statistics.sk/mosmis/eng/run.html

Villages and municipalities in Snina District
Zemplín (region)
Rusyn communities